The Raging Neisse (or Jauersche Neiße) is a river in Poland. Its largest tributary is the Little Neisse.

It flows down through the lowlands among the foothills of the Sudetes and the heights of Hainau, through the towns of Bolków (Bolkenhain) and Jawor (Jauer). It then merges with the Kaczawa (Katzbach) at a height of  not far from Jawor near the village of Slup (Schlaup) on the battlefield of the Battle of Katzbach. 

During heavy rain and due to its mountainous character, the water level of this small river can rise by up to 2.5 metres or about 8 feet, whence its name, the "Raging" Neisse.

Napoleonic Wars 
The river became famous as a result  of the Battle of Katzbach when fleeing French troops being pursued by Marschall Blücher were driven into the Katzbach and Raging Neisse rivers which were swollen as the result of a thunderstorm.

Footnotes

References

Literature 
 
 Henderson, Ernest F. (2015). Blücher And The Uprising Of Prussia Against Napoleon, 1806-1815.
 Dodge, Lt. Col. Theodore Ayrault Dodge (2014). Napoleon: a History of the Art of War. [1907]

Rivers of Poland